Socius may refer to:

 Socii,  of the Roman Republic in classical times
 a Latin noun meaning "comrade, friend, ally" (adjectival form: socialis) and used to describe a bond or interaction between parties that are friendly, or at least civil; it has given rise to the word "society"
 Socius (insect anatomy), a part of the Lepidoptera genitalia
 Socius (journal), an academic journal published by the American Sociological Association
 Socius (philosophy), a philosophical concept developed by Gilles Deleuze

Science disambiguation pages